Nyeri Town Constituency is an electoral constituency in Kenya. It is one of six constituencies in Nyeri County. The constituency in its current form was established for the 1988 elections, after splitting of former Nyeri Constituency into two; Tetu Constituency and Nyeri Town constituency.

Members of Parliament

Wards

References

External links 
Nyeri Town Constituency

Nyeri
Constituencies in Nyeri County
Constituencies in Central Province (Kenya)
1988 establishments in Kenya
Constituencies established in 1988